Valhi, Inc. is an American holding company operating through wholly and majority-owned subsidiaries in a number of different industries. It was founded in 1987 as a result of the merger of the LLC Corporation and Amalgamated Sugar Company. The Contran Corporation owned 93% of Valhi's common stock as of December 2014.
The chairman of the company was Harold Simmons until his death in 2013. As of 2014 it was a Fortune 1000 company.

Subsidiaries 
Wholly and majority-owned subsidiaries include 80% of Kronos Worldwide, 86% of CompX International Inc., 83% of NL Industries, Basic Management, Inc. and The LandWell Company. Former subsidiaries include Amalgamated Sugar Company, oilfield services firm Baroid, forest products firm Medford, and Arby’s franchise Sybra.

References

Companies based in Dallas
Holding companies of the United States
Companies listed on the New York Stock Exchange